The soundtrack of the film Let It Shine features 13 original songs and was released on June 12, 2012. The tracks were written by top songwriters and producers in the pop and R&B business.

The soundtrack debuted at number 29 on the US Billboard 200. It has also charted at number 22 on the US Digital Albums chart 3 on the US Rap Albums chart, number 2 on the US Top Soundtracks chart and topped the US Kid Albums chart. On June 29, 2012, the soundtrack topped the US Rap Albums chart at 1.

Singles
"Don't Run Away" was the first single released from the soundtrack, performed by Tyler James Williams featuring IM5. The song was released on April 20, 2012. It was written by Armato, James, In-Q, Thomas Sturges and Jon Vella, produced by Tim James and Antonina Armato.
"What I Said" was the second single released from the soundtrack, performed by Coco Jones. The song was released on May 22, 2012. It was written by Lambert "Stereo" Waldrip, Justin Mobley, Anya Vasilenko, Tocarra Phillips and Steven Jones, produced by Lambert "Stereo" Waldrip

Critical reception

Matt Collar of AllMusic gave a review: "The soundtrack to the 2012 Disney musical, Let It Shine features a mix of pop R&B, dance-oriented hip-hop, and contemporary gospel numbers. The film is conceived as a modern hip-hop version of the Cyrano de Bergerac story, and the soundtrack includes cuts by stars Tyler James Williams as Cyrus DeBarge and Coco Jones as Roxanne "Roxie" Andrews, along with others. On the pop end, these are bright, slickly produced tracks that bring to mind a mix of the dance-club sound of Mike Posner, Lupe Fiasco, and Usher. Elsewhere, there are a few passionate, gospel-tinged ballads, including Jones' "Good to Be Home" and the uplifting title track."

Commercial performance
The soundtrack debuted at number 29 then peak at number 12 on the US Billboard 200. It has also charted at number 22 on the US Digital Albums chart 3 on the US Rap Albums chart, number 2 on the US Top Soundtracks chart and topped the US Kid Albums chart. It topped the US Rap Albums on June 29, 2012.

Track listing

Charts

Weekly charts

Year-end charts

References

2012 soundtrack albums
Walt Disney Records soundtracks